Slush is a startup and tech event held annually in Helsinki, Finland. Slush facilitates meetings between the founders of startups and investors such as venture capitalists, accomplished with events such as matchmaking and pitching competitions. Slush aims to build a worldwide startup community. In 2021, Slush brought together 8,800 attendees from around the world to participate together in this global networking festival.

Since 2015, Slush also run events throughout the world. These include previous events such as Slush Tokyo, Slush Shanghai and Slush Small Talks events. Since 2021, Slush'D has served as the primary avenue for international offshoots of the main Helsinki event.

Slush has created various products and resources available year-round to support and inform founders and investors. Among these products are Soaked by Slush, a startup media platform established in 2019, and Node by Slush, a startup and investor community established a year later.

The company's turnover is more than ten million euros.

History 
There are two stories of the founding of Slush: The original story is that the first Slush was founded and organized by Kai Lemmetty, Ville Vesterinen, Helene Auramo, Peter Vesterbacka and Timo Airisto (HS) and it was covered by Taloussanomat. One of the original founders, Ville Vesterinen has written an article about the early days to support this storyline.

Later variations of the Slush origin story explains that the founders of Slush were Peter Vesterbacka, then working at Rovio with Angry Birds, together with Timo Airisto, a lawyer.

In 2011, Miki Kuusi became the CEO, and together with Atte Hujanen and Jenni Kääriäinen organized the event at Kaapelitehdas, with 1500 attendees. The event was staffed mainly by student volunteers from Aaltoes (Aalto Entrepreneurship Society) of Aalto University.

At Kaapelitehdas, 2009-2015 
Slush was held for the first time in 2008 at Kulttuuritehdas Korjaamo. Slush was founded by Kai Lemmetty, Ville Vesterinen, Helene Auramo, Peter Vesterbacka and Timo Airisto. In 2009, the event moved to Kaapelitehdas. For the first three years, the event was aimed at local entrepreneurs and investors. Between 2008 and 2010, the number of participants increased from 250 to 500. The winners of the Slush pitching competitions in those years were Illtags, Sibesonke and Dealmachine. The 2011 event had 1,500 participants, 150 growth companies and 15 private equity companies. The pitching competition was won by Ovelin (now Yousician), a developer of music-related technologies.

In 2012, 3,500 people, 560 growth companies and 41 private equity firms participated in Slush. FishBrain, the social media aimed at fishermen, won the pitching competition of the year.

In 2013, Slush gathered a total of 7,000 people, 1,200 growth companies and 120 private equity companies at Kaapelitehdas. The event received a great deal of international attention and was listed in The New York Times and The Wall Street Journal, among others. Speakers at the event included Toomas Hendrik Ilves (former President of Estonia), John Riccitiello (CEO of Electronic Arts), and Niklas Zennström (Founder of Skype).

The 2013 pitching competition was won by Weekdone, which is developing a job tracking tool for teams.

At Messukeskus, 2014 - present 
In 2014, 14,000 people from 79 countries visited Slush. The event was attended by about 1,400 growth companies, 750 investors, 700 suppliers and 140 private equity firms. Speakers at the event included Martin Lorentzon (founder of Spotify), Wang Yang (Deputy Prime Minister of China), Leland Melvin (astronaut at NASA), and Esa-Pekka Salonen (conductor and composer). Nokia unveiled its first Android tablet, the Nokia N1.

The event in 2014 was the largest technical production in Finnish history, surpassing the Eurovision Song Contest held in Finland in 2007. The 2014 pitching competition was won by Enbrite.ly, which develops internet traffic management services.

Slush 2015 was held from 11 to 12. November. Slush Hacks was held for the first time with the participation of Ultrahack, Junction, Industryhack and the AEC (Architecture, Engineering, Construction) Hackathon. The winners of each challenge were able to pitch their ideas on the Slush stage and the best idea / team won €20,000.

Slush received the President of the Republic's Internationalization Award in November 2015. 

In 2016, Slush was held from November 30 to December 1. At the Helsinki Fair Center. A new sister event was Slush Music, which was expected to bring 1,500 technology and music professionals to the Cable Factory for one day. Slush, in cooperation with Finnair, organized a direct scheduled flight from San Francisco to Helsinki. The nickname "Nerd bird" is also used for scheduled flights.

The 2017 event was held on November 30th and December 1st. The main trends were analytics and artificial intelligence. The 2018 Slush was attended by 20,000 visitors. The content of the event sought to highlight the actors and background influencers of technology companies, which are not usually presented in public. Experienced entrepreneurs as well as executives such as Werner Vogels (Amazon's CTO), spoke at the event.

In 2019, Slush grew to 25,000 participants and Slush also organized major side events on product management and game development, among other things. The event featured 200 speakers, including investor Michael Moritz and Stripe founder John Collison.

Event summary by year

See also 
 Assembly (demoparty)
 OMR Festival

References

Technology conferences
Conferences in Finland
Non-profit corporations
Recurring events established in 2008